Raquel Kops-Jones and Abigail Spears were the defending champions, but lost in the quarterfinals to Andrea Hlaváčková and Lucie Hradecká.
Garbiñe Muguruza and Carla Suárez Navarro won the title, defeating Hlaváčková and Hradecká in the final, 6–4, 6–4.

Seeds

Draw

References
 Main Draw

Aegon Classicandnbsp;- Doubles
Doubles